John Mutsaers (born 15 April 1972) is a Dutch former professional footballer who played as a forward.

Career
Born in Tilburg, he began his career at Willem II. After a spell with RBC, he later played for AZ between 1994 and 2000, scoring 56 goals in 177 appearances in all competitions. He was top scorer of the Eerste Divisie in the 1995–96 season. Although a fan's favourite at AZ, his time there was marred by injury. He had an unsuccessful trial with English club Reading in 1998. He retired from professional football in 2004, after playing with MVV Maastricht. After retiring, he worked as a coach at Willem II, and played amateur football for USI'19 and WSC Waalwijk.

Personal life
He has one son and two daughters. In 2011, he was living in Oisterwijk, where he worked in the building trade.

References

1972 births
Living people
Dutch footballers
Footballers from Tilburg
Association football forwards
Willem II (football club) players
RBC Roosendaal players
AZ Alkmaar players
MVV Maastricht players
Eredivisie players
Eerste Divisie players